Rachel Shelly Israel (or Sheli/Shelina, ; born ) is a Brazilian-born Israeli football defender currently playing for Israeli First League for ASA Tel Aviv University, with which she has also played in the Champions League. She is a member of the Israeli national team, where she made her debut in the 2007 World Cup qualifying against Estonia.

Club career
Israel was born in Brazil and was adopted by an Israeli couple at an early age. She grew up in Netanya and played for Maccabi Netanya until the club had folded and Israel moved to play for ASA Tel Aviv University, where she played ever since.
Israel won 5 championships and 3 cups with ASA Tel Aviv, and represented the club in the Champions League in each edition since 2010–11, scoring four goals for the club.

Management career
In 2011 Israel started coaching a football team, Bnot Caesarea, which she also partly owned. In 2013, following a dispute with the team's co-owner, Ran Ben Basat, Israel quit the club and started Bnot Netanya. Since 2013 Israel also serves as coach of ASA Tel Aviv University U-16 team.

International career
Israel made her international debut for Israel women's national football team in 2005 against Estonia and so far had played a total of 32 matches for the national team, scoring four goals. Israel also played for the U-19 national team, making a total of 14 appearances and scoring two goals, between 2001 and 2004.

Honours
 Championships (5):
 2009–10, 2010–11, 2011–12, 2012–13, 2012–13
 Cup (3):
 2010–11, 2011–12, 2013–14

References

External links
 
 Club Position Details – Shelly Israel Israeli Football Association 

1986 births
Living people
Jewish sportspeople
Israeli Jews
Israeli women's footballers
Footballers from Netanya
Israel women's international footballers
Maccabi Netanya F.C. (women) players
ASA Tel Aviv University players
Women's association football defenders
Brazilian emigrants to Israel